Svijanský Újezd is a municipality and village in Liberec District in the Liberec Region of the Czech Republic. It has about 400 inhabitants.

Administrative parts
The village of Močítka and the hamlet of Jirsko 2.díl are administrative parts of Svijanský Újezd.

History
The first written mention of Svijanský Újezd is from 1436.

References

External links

Villages in Liberec District